Brookfields is a prosperous neighbourhood in Freetown, Sierra Leone.

History
During the colonial period, newly arriving British administrators and other staff stayed in an area called the "Transit Camp" before more long-term accommodation could be arranged. After independence, this are was converted into the Brookfields Hotel.

Youyi Building
The Youyi Building houses several government ministries:
 3rd floor: Ministry of Agriculture, Forestry and Food Security
 4th floor: Ministry of Lands, Country Planning, & the Environment
 5th floor: Ministry of Mineral Resources
 6th floor: Ministry of Health and Sanitation
 7th floor Ministry of Fisheries & Marine Resources
 8th floor Ministry of Information and Communication

References

Neighbourhoods in Freetown